Cavan General Hospital is a public hospital located in Cavan, County Cavan, Ireland. It is managed by RCSI Hospitals.

History
The hospital was officially opened by Rory O'Hanlon, Minister for Health, in 1989.

Services
The hospital provides 264 beds, of which 193 are in-patient acute beds, while 46 are reserved for acute day cases. A further 25 beds are for psychiatric services. It provides acute-care hospital services including a 24-hour emergency department.

Transport and access
There are car parking areas located in the hospital grounds. The hospital is a short taxi journey or around 15–20 minutes on foot from the centre of Cavan. Leydons Coaches route 930 (Cavan-Ballyconnell-Enniskillen), Bus Éireann route 175 (Cavan-Cootehill-Monaghan) and Whartons Travel route 975 Longford-Arva-Cavan (operated on behalf of the National Transport Authority) provide public bus links to/from the hospital.

References

Hospitals in County Cavan
Cavan (town)
Health Service Executive hospitals
1989 establishments in Ireland
Hospitals established in 1989
Hospital buildings completed in 1989